Oscarino Costa Silva, best known as Oscarino (January 17, 1907 –September 16, 1990) was a Brzilian association footballer in offensive midfielder role. He was born in Niterói, Rio de Janeiro State.

During his career (1928–1940), he played for Ypiranga Niterói, América, Vasco da Gama and São Cristóvão. He participated in two squads that won two Rio de Janeiro State Championship, in 1935 and 1936. He was on the Brazilian team roster for the 1930 FIFA World Cup finals.

He died at the age of 83.

Honours

Club
 Campeonato Fluminense (4): 
Ypiranga: 1928, 1929, 1930, 1931
 Campeonato Carioca (2): 
América: 1935
Vasco da Gama: 1936

References

Oscarino
1930 FIFA World Cup players
Oscarino
Oscarino
Oscarino
Oscarino
Oscarino
Oscarino